Aglaia odorata is a species of plant in the family Meliaceae. It is found in Cambodia, China, Indonesia, Myanmar, Taiwan, Thailand, Vietnam, and possibly Laos.

It is occasionally sold as a house plant under the name "Chinese perfume plant."  It can be grown outdoors in USDA zones 9 and 10.

Description
Aglaia odorata is a small tree that retains its green leaves throughout the year, and can reach a height of 2 to 5 meters. It is multiple branched and its leaves are 5 to 12 centimeters long. It has small golden yellow raceme oval-shaped flowers with 6 petals. The fruit is red, about one centimeter long and egg-shaped, containing one to two seeds.

Uses

Traditional medicinal use

Many parts of Aglaia odorata - roots, leaves, flowers and branches - can be used as medicine.

 The roots are boiled with water to make a drink to increase appetite. In the Philippines, the roots and leaves can be used as a tonic.
 The dried flowers are used to cure mouth ulcers and reduce fever.
 In China, the dried branches and leaves are boiled in water and used to reduce pain from rheumatic joints, injuries from falls, superficial infections and toxic swelling.
 According to research on branches by Yunnan Agricultural University and research on roots by Xishuangbanna Tropical Botanical Garden, Aglaia odorata has anti-cancer components: rocaglaol, molecular weight 434.48 g/mole and rocaglamide, molecular weight 505.55 g/mole. These components have significant cytotoxicity against blood cancer, liver cancer, lung cancer, breast cancer and colon cancer.

Perfume
The dried flowers can be used to produce perfume for clothes and mixed into cigarettes.

Herbicide
Aglaia odorata can be used as an organic herbicide to control grass and weeds in fields, such as rice fields and maize fields.

References

External links
Aglaia odorata Lour. Medicinal Plant Images Database (School of Chinese Medicine, Hong Kong Baptist University)  

odorata
Flora of China
Near threatened plants
Taxonomy articles created by Polbot